"100 Years Ago" is a song by the English rock band the Rolling Stones featured on their 1973 album Goats Head Soup.

Background
Credited to Mick Jagger and Keith Richards, guitarist Mick Taylor said at the time of its release, "Some of the songs we used (for the album) were pretty old. '100 Years Ago' was one that Mick [Jagger] had written two years ago and which we hadn't really got around to using before." The song is described by Tom Maginnis in his review as having a, "wistful air with a country lilt... before making several tempo shifts into a funky, sped-up groove..." The song's lyrics see Jagger reflect on aging:

The song then veers into a distinctive breakdown, slowing considerably before Jagger begins singing a verse in a noticeable drawl (beginning with the lyrics, "Call... Me... Lazybones... Ain't got no time to waste away"), before speeding back-up and turning into a funk jam of sorts.

Recording took place at Dynamic Sounds studio in Kingston, Jamaica, in November and December, 1972, with a final mix conducted in June 1973. Jagger performs lead vocals and is accompanied by Taylor on backing. Taylor performs the song's guitars while Keith Richards and Charlie Watts perform bass and drums, respectively. Nicky Hopkins provides piano while Billy Preston performs clavinet.

Live performances
"100 Years Ago" was only played on the first two performances of European Tour of 1973, and has not been performed live since.

References

External links
Complete official lyrics

The Rolling Stones songs
1973 songs
Songs written by Jagger–Richards
Song recordings produced by Jimmy Miller